Anisa Kospiri (born 1980) is an Albanian model who won the title of Miss Universe Albania 2001. She represented Albania at Miss Universe 2002 and made it to the top ten and she is the first Albanian contestant to compete in Miss Universe.

References

1980s births
21st-century Albanian models
Albanian beauty pageant winners
Albanian female models
Living people
Miss Universe 2002 contestants
People from Tirana
Year of birth uncertain